The University of Alberta Students' Union (UASU) is the student society that represents undergraduate students at the University of Alberta. Originally established in 1909, it is a non-profit corporation that operates under the authority of the Post-Secondary Learning Act (Alberta). Its membership consists of the roughly 31,000 undergraduate students enrolled at the university.

With an annual budget of more than $10,000,000 and hundreds of paid and volunteer staff, the Students' Union serves as an advocate for students and provides a variety of services to its members. The Students' Union also operates a number of businesses, manages various targeted trust funds, hosts a wide variety of entertainment and educational events, and runs the Students' Union Building.

Students' Council
The Students' Council is the highest decision-making body of the UASU and is composed of a speaker, a general manager (both of whom are non-voting members), councillors elected from each faculty, 5 executive members and an undergraduate student representative to serve on the University's Board of Governors, all of whom are elected in an annual campus-wide general election every March. 

The breakdown of faculty councillors is as below: 

 2 from the Faculty of Agricultural, Life and Environmental Sciences
 7 from the Faculty of Arts
 1 from the Faculty of Augustana
 2 from the Faculty of Business
 3 from the Faculty of Education
 5 from the Faculty of Engineering
 1 from Faculte Saint-Jean
 1 from the Faculty of Kinesiology, Sport & Recreation
 1 from the Faculty of Law
 1 from the Faculty of Medicine & Dentistry
 1 from the Faculty of Native Studies
 1 from the Faculty of Nursing
 1 from the Faculty of Open Studies
 1 from the Faculty of Pharmacy
 7 from the Faculty of Science

Representation
Provincially, the Students' Union participates in the Council of Alberta University Students. The Students' Union was a founding member of the Canadian Alliance of Students Associations. While it took a brief hiatus on its membership, having pulled out in 2003, the Students' Union moved to rejoin CASA in March 2008.

In the fall of 2016, the Students' Union expanded the U-Pass program to Fort Saskatchewan, Leduc and Spruce Grove.

Services
The Students' Union provides a number of services to assist students in their academic careers. These services include:
 Access Fund
 Campus Food Bank
 InfoLink
 Ombudservice
 Peer Support Centre
 Safewalk
 Student Job Registry
The Students' Union also runs several businesses, which offer discounts to Students' Union staff and volunteers.

Students' Union Building 
Built in 1967, the Students' Union Building (SUB) is the headquarters of the Students' Union.  It contains the Horowitz Theatre.

Myer Horowitz Theatre 
The Myer Horowtiz Theatre is a 720-seat concert hall used a venue for a variety of music, dance and lectures. The theatre hosts no regular season, and is rented by various student and community groups. They also regularly host shows organized by local promoters looking for a smaller intimate venue in Edmonton.

Built in 1967 during the building of the Students' Union Building, the theatre was originally called SUB Theatre. The theatre has been through two renovations since opening, a major overall in 1983 and a technical update in 1988. The theatre was renamed in 1989 to honour the outgoing university president at the time, Dr. Myer Horowitz.

Notable past presidents

Several people who have served as president of the University of Alberta Students' Union have gone on to achieve some level of fame.

James Harwood Ogilvie, who served as president in 1917-1918, went on to become a long time alderman on Edmonton City Council and an unsuccessful candidate for the Conservative Party in the 1935 and 1940 federal elections in Edmonton West.
Percy Griffith Davies was president in 1925-1926 and later served as a Conservative Member of Parliament from 1932 until 1935.
Gerard Amerongen, president in 1943-1944, became a Progressive Conservative member of the Legislative Assembly of Alberta (and later its Speaker), representing Edmonton Meadowlark from 1971 until 1986.
Peter Lougheed, president in 1951-1952, was Premier of Alberta from 1971 until 1985.
Lou Hyndman, president in 1958-1959, was a Progressive Conservative member of the Legislative Assembly of Alberta (representing Edmonton West from 1967 until 1971 and Edmonton-Glenora from 1971 until 1986) and provincial treasurer.
Marilyn Pilkington, president in 1968-1969, was the first female Dean of Osgoode Hall in 1983.
David Leadbeater, president in 1969-1970, became the youngest alderman in the history of the Edmonton City Council, elected at the age of 27 and serving from 1974 until 1977.
Mike Nickel, president in 1985-1986, became an alderman (2004–2007), two-time mayoral candidate, and prominent conservative in Edmonton.
Mike Hudema, president in 2002-2003, is a prominent activist.

See also
The Gateway

References

External links

University Site

Alberta
Students
1909 establishments in Alberta